Isn't Life Terrible? is a 1925 American film starring Charley Chase and featuring Oliver Hardy and Fay Wray. It is the debut of director Leo McCarey.  This short is a parody on D. W. Griffith's 1924 drama Isn't Life Wonderful (1924). The staircase used in this film is the same outdoor staircase seen in Hats Off (1927) and The Music Box (1932). The staircase still exists in Silver Lake, Los Angeles.

Cast
 Charley Chase as Charley
 Katherine Grant as The Wife
 Oliver "Babe" Hardy as Remington - the Brother-in-Law
 Lon Poff as Mr. Jolly
 Dorothy Morrison as Little Black Girl (uncredited)
 Nancy McKee as The Daughter (uncredited)
 Leo Willis as The salesman (uncredited)
 Fay Wray as Potential pen buyer (uncredited)
 Charles Stevenson as Medical Officer (uncredited)
 Charlie Hall as Steward Who Drops Plates (uncredited)
 William Gillespie as Latin American Official (uncredited)
 Sammy Brooks (uncredited)

See also
 List of American films of 1925

External links

Isn't Life Terrible? at SilentEra

1925 films
1925 comedy films
1925 short films
Silent American comedy films
American black-and-white films
Films directed by Leo McCarey
American silent short films
American comedy short films
1920s American films
1920s English-language films